MarketFair (also referred to as MarketFair Mall) is a shopping mall in West Windsor, New Jersey, with a Princeton mailing address. About 83,000 cars pass by every day. The anchor stores are AMC Theatres, Eastern Mountain Sports, Jos. A. Bank, Pottery Barn, LensCrafters, and Barnes & Noble.

History
MarketFair Mall was built in 1987 by JMB/Federated Realty (now Urban Shopping Centers), and is managed by CBRE. The one-story mall, then called Princeton MarketFair, was positioned as a fashion center. Tenants included The Limited, Petite Sophisticate, Structure.  was put into repositioning and updating MarketFair since 1996, including $2 million spent renovating the food court. By July 2001, sales had increased 50%, or $20 million, to $61 million under the new management.

Tenants
There are about 47 different establishments in the mall. Home furnishings accounts for a large part of the center’s mix. The mall is distinguished by its assortment of specialty shops, such as Villeroy & Boch, Platypus, Williams Sonoma, and Pottery Barn. Restaurants featured in the mall include: Tommy’s Tavern + Tap (opened on December 7, 2020; replaced Big Fish Seafood Bistro), P.F. Chang's, Bobby's Burger Palace (opened summer 2012, closed 2020), and T.G.I. Friday’s.  Recent changes to the mall include the addition of a new Banana Republic concept store, construction for a West Elm, renovation of its Barnes and Noble, and the new additions of Seasons 52, Bahama Breeze, Qdoba, and a Corner Bakery that all opened in Fall 2013. There is also a ten-screen AMC Theatres and Eastern Mountain Sports.

The mall's regular clientele tend to be affluent, educated consumers with an average household income of $120,000.

References

External links

West Windsor, New Jersey
U.S. Route 1
Shopping malls in New Jersey
Shopping malls established in 1987
Buildings and structures in Mercer County, New Jersey
Tourist attractions in Mercer County, New Jersey
Shopping malls in the New York metropolitan area